Ajil may refer to:
Ajil (town), Malaysia
Ajil (state constituency), Malaysia
Ajil, Iranian trail mix, such as Ajîl-e Moshkel-goshâ